Marcel Berthet (4 March 1887 – 7 April 1953) was a French cyclist who rode professionally between 1907 and 1923. He took part in the 1908 Tour de France, and set multiple records in one-hour ride in 1907, 1912 and 1913. He won the six-day race of Brussels in 1921 and finished second in 1920. His brother Ernest Berthet was also a competitive cyclist.

References 

1887 births
1953 deaths
French male cyclists
Sportspeople from Neuilly-sur-Seine
Cyclists from Île-de-France